Kissidougou Airport  is an airport serving Kissidougou, a city in the Faranah Region of Guinea.

The Kissidougou non-directional beacon (Ident: KU) is located on the field.

Accidents and incidents
On 16 January 1984, Douglas C-47 9Q-CYD of Transport Aérien Zairois departed the runway following an engine failure on take-off. Dry grass was set on fire when it came into contact with the hot engine and the aircraft was subsequently destroyed by fire. All seventeen people on board escaped uninjured. The aircraft was operating a non-scheduled passenger flight in support of the Dakar Rally.

See also

Transport in Guinea
List of airports in Guinea

References

External links
 OurAirports - Kissidougou
 SkyVector - Kissidougou Airport
 OpenStreetMap - Kissidougou
 FallingRain - Kissidougou Airport
 
 Google Earth

Airports in Guinea